Collection d'Arnell~Andréa is a French neoclassical darkwave band founded by Jean-Christophe d'Arnell (main composer, writer, piano/keyboards), Pascal Andréa, and Chloé St Liphard in 1986. Andréa left the band shortly after its founding, before its first performance. However, d'Arnell left Andréa's name in the band name. Their music features prominently keyboards, cello, and Chloé's vocals. The band is known for including a large collection or ensemble of musicians in its live performances and has performed at numerous international music festivals including Germany's Wave-Gotik-Treffen. Many of their albums have focused on late 19th and early 20th century themes.

When the band signed with Prikosnovénie in 2002, the label re-edited and re-released many of the previous New Rose Records albums that had previously been out of print. Signing with Prikosnovénie also resulted in three new albums and a new tour schedule through Europe.

Discography

Full length albums and EPs

 Autumn's Breath for Anton's Death (1988)
 Un Automne à Loroy New Rose Records (1989), reissued Prikosnovénie (2004)
 Au Val des Roses New Rose Records (1990), reissued Prikosnovénie (2005)
 Les Marronniers New Rose Records (1992)
 Villers-aux-Vents (Février 1916) New Rose Records (1994), reissued Prikosnovénie (2003)
 Cirses des Champs Last Call Records (1996)
 Coll AGE 1988-1998 Last Call Records 2 CD compilation (1998)
 Tristesse des Mânes Prikosnovénie (2002)
 The Bower of Despair Prikosnovénie (2004)
 Exposition, Eaux-Fortes et Méandres Prikosnovénie (2007)
 Vernes-Monde Prikosnovénie (2010)

Compilation appearances
 Anton's Mind Getting Blind on 13 Lively Art (1990)
 Icare (1990)
 Une Attente Douleur on Premonition Lively Art (1992)
 L'Aulne + la Mort on Heavenly Voices Part 2 Hyperium (1993)
 Drifting on Kälte Container Radio Luxor, Sub Terranean (2001)
 Wild Trees on Fairy World II Prikosnovénie (2005)
 The Long Shadow on Fairy World III Prikosnovénie (2007)
 Closer to Unicorn on Fairy World IV Prikosnovénie (2008)

List of band members

Studio and live
Pascal Andréa (1986) -- co-founder
Jean-Christophe d'Arnell (1986–present) -- co-founder, piano, keyboards, percussion
Chloé St Liphard (1986–present) -- co-founder, vocals
Charlotte (1989) -- cello
Thierry Simonnet (1989) -- keyboards
Peter Rakoto (1989–1990) -- bass guitar
Xavier Gaschignard (1990–present) -- cello
Franz Torrès-Quévédo (1992–present) -- guitar and bass guitar, also has been a member of O Quam Tristis, Opera Multi Steel, The Three Cold Men, and Thy Violent Vanities
Stephan Kehlsen (1996) -- bass guitar
Carine Grieg (present) -- keyboards, backing vocals, also a member of Opera Multi Steel, Gantök, and O Quam Tristis
Thibault d'Aboville (2002–present) -- viola, also a member of Gantök and Lili Kunst
Vincent Magnien (2004–present) -- electric guitar

References and notes

External links

Collection d'Arnell Andréa website
 Collection d'Arnell Andréa on the Prikosnovénie label's website.
Discography from Discogs

French dark wave musical groups
Cold wave groups
Prikosnovénie artists
Musical groups established in 1986